This is a list of cities (excluding urban agglomerations) that have a population of above 100,000 and towns that have a population of above 20,000 in the state of Telangana.

Categorization 

City: or Class I Town: Towns with population of 100,000 and above are called cities.
, there are six municipal corporations and eight municipalities in the state with populations above 100,000.

Class II Towns: Towns with population between 50,000 and 99,999

Class III Towns: Towns with population between 20,000 and 49,999

Note: The statistical data represented here is based on "Census of India 2011", conducted by "The Office of the Registrar General and Census Commissioner, India" under Ministry of Home Affairs, Government of India

The districts in Telangana were organized in 2016 and later 2019, increasing from 10 to 33. As the census reports are based on the old districts in 2011, the cities and towns are categorized under both the present and erstwhile district.

Cities 
The following are the cities with populations above 1,00,000 according to the 2011 Census.

Class II towns 
The following are the towns with populations above 50,000 according to the 2011 Census.

Class III towns 
The following are the Class III towns with populations above 20,000 according to the 2011 Census.

See also
List of cities in India by population
List of Smart and Amrut Cities in Telangana
List of urban agglomerations in Telangana

References

Notes 

Cities by population
 Population
Telangana
Cities and towns